Thomas "Tom" Woodward Lentz Jr. (born June 11, 1951) is an American art historian and curator. Lentz served as the Elizabeth and John Moors Cabot Director of the Harvard Art Museums from 2003 to 2015. He was the ninth director in its history.

Career
A native of California, Lentz received a Bachelor of Arts in Art History from Claremont McKenna College in 1974. He continued at the University of California, Berkeley receiving a Master of Arts in Near Eastern Studies in 1978. Lentz then received a Master of Arts and a Doctor of Philosophy in Art History from Harvard University in 1981 and 1985, respectively. His studies focused on Islamic art, and more specifically, on Persian painting. Lentz wrote his doctoral dissertation on "Painting at Herat under Bāysunghur ibn Shāhrukh."

In 1982, while studying at Harvard, Lentz was hired to his first role as Curator of Asian Art at the Rhode Island School of Design Museum, a post that he held until 1984. He then moved to the Los Angeles County Museum of Art as Curator of Egyptian, Islamic, and West Asian Art. In 1992, Lentz accepted his first directorial position as Assistant Director of the Freer Gallery of Art and the Arthur M. Sackler Gallery, both at the Smithsonian Institution. Three years later, he was promoted to Deputy Director, and then to Acting Director. In 2000, he officially became Director of the International Art Museums.

In 2003, Lentz was named the Elizabeth and John Moors Cabot Director of the Harvard Art Museums, becoming the ninth director in its history and succeeding James Cuno. During the directorship, Lentz guided the museum through a major renovation, led by the architect Renzo Piano. In 2007, Lentz was elected a member of the American Academy of Arts and Sciences. In 2015, he stepped down from his post as director.

Select works
Architecture in Islamic Painting: Permanent and Impermanent Worlds, with Michele A. De Angelis, 1982, 
Timur and the Princely Vision: Persian Art and Culture in the Fifteenth Century, 1989, 
Beyond the Legacy: Anniversary Acquisitions for the Freer Gallery of Art and the Arthur M. Sackler Gallery, with Thomas Lawton, 1999,

See also
List of American Academy of Arts and Sciences members (2006–2019)
List of Harvard University people
List of people from California
List of University of California, Berkeley alumni in arts and media

References

External links
Harvard University profile

1951 births
Living people
Claremont McKenna College alumni
Harvard University alumni
University of California, Berkeley alumni
American art historians
Directors of museums in the United States
Rhode Island School of Design Museum
People associated with the Los Angeles County Museum of Art
Smithsonian Institution people
Harvard University administrators